The Grand Lodge Alpina of Switzerland (German: Schweizerische Grossloge Alpina) (French: Grande Loge Suisse Alpina) is one of the Grand Lodges of Freemasons in Switzerland.

History
The Grand Lodge was founded in 1844. At the time of the foundation there were said to be around 30 masonic lodges operating in Switzerland.

In 1921, it became a founding member of the International Masonic Association in alliance with the Grand Orient of France, Grand Orient of Belgium, Grand Orient of the Netherlands and the Grand Orient of Italy, amongst many others. Indeed, the international headquarters of the Association was at 20, rue Général-Dufour, Grande-Chancellerie, Geneva, Switzerland. The first Grand Chancellor was a previous Grand Master of the Grand Lodge Alpina of Switzerland; Édouard Quartier-la-Tente. The second Grand Chancellor, too, had just retired as Grand Master of the Grand Lodge Alpina of Switzerland; Isaac Reverchon.

The right-wing Swiss Army colonel Arthur Fonjallaz attempted to orchestrate a legal ban on Freemasonry (and other societies) in the 1930s, apparently in sympathy with bans introduced by Hitler's Germany and Mussolini's Italy at that period. The attempted ban was rejected by the Swiss people in 1937.

In 2008 the Grand Lodge listed 4,000 members in 83 lodges under its jurisdiction. It has since consecrated 3 further lodges, taking the total to 86.

In 2009 the Grand Lodge Alpina adopted an official position on women's freemasonry. In common with the United Grand Lodge of England, and many other regular masonic jurisdictions, Grand Lodge Alpina encourages its members and its lodges to cooperate with women's masonic lodges in social events and charitable endeavours, but maintains entirely separate organisation and ceremonial, with no inter-visitation between formal meeting of male and female lodges.

Recognition
The Grand Lodge Alpina is recognised by the United Grand Lodge of England (UGLE). UGLE recognition is a significant indicator of a Regular Masonic jurisdiction. Although traditionally linked to the more liberal Continental Freemasonry of the Grand Orient de France, Alpina became closer to the United Grand Lodge of England after World War II, leading to official recognition. As a result, some liberal members left the Grand Lodge, and ultimately set up the rival Grand Orient de Suisse.

Many members of the Grand Lodge Alpina also belong to the Helvetica Lodge No 4894 (UGLE) in London, which exists to serve Swiss freemasons in England, and to cement Anglo-Swiss relations.

Grand Masters
 1844 - 1850 : Johann Jakob Hottinger (1783-1860)
 1850 - 1856 : Karl Gustav Jung (1794-1864)
 1856 - 1862 : Abram Daniel Meystre (1813-1870)
 1862 - 1868 : Ernst F. Gelpke (1807-1870)
 1868 - 1871 : Johann Jakob Rüegg (1830-1884)
 1871 - 1874 : Aimé Humbert (1819-1900)
 1874 - 1878 : Karl Tscharner (1812)
 1878 - 1884 : John Cuénod (1822-1900)
 1884 - 1890 : Ernst Karl Jung (1841-1912)
 1890 - 1895 : Élie Ducommun (1833-1906)
 1895 - 1900 : Caspar Friedrich Hausmann (1845-1920)
 1900 - 1905 : Édouard Quartier-la-Tente (1855-1925)
 1905 - 1910 : Hermann Häberlin (1862-1938)
 1910 - 1915 : Jacques Oettli (1843-1927)
 1915 - 1920 : Jakob Schwenter (1857-1938)
 1920 - 1925 : Isaac Reverchon (1868-1927)
 1925 - 1930 : Fritz Brandenberg (1865-1942)
 1930 - 1935 : Auguste Jeanneret (1867-1947)
 1935 - 1939 : Kurt von Sury (1882-1977)
 1939 - 1942 : Edmond Jomini (1900-1956)
 1942 - 1947 : Josef Böni (1895-1974)
 1947 - 1952 : Albert Natural (1880-1960)
 1952 - 1957 : Walther Kasser (1886-1977)
 1957 - 1961 : Theodor Hinnen (1904-1961)
 1961 - 1962 : Harald Ziegler (1906-1977)
 1962 - 1966 : Charles Sthioul (1898-1988)
 1966 - 1969 : Walter Winter (1890-)
 1969 - 1970 : Gubert Giger (1903-1982)
 1970 - 1974 : Willy Wyser (1923)
 1974 - 1978: Paul Bauhofer (1909)
 1978 - 1982 : Orazio Schaub (1922)
 1982 - 1984 : Alain Marti (1944)
 1986 - 1990 : Walter von Ins (1922)
 1990 - 1994 : André Binggeli (1925)
 1994 - 1997 : Hans Bühler
 1997 - 2000 : Jean-Jacques Sunier
 2001 - 2004 : Alberto Menasche (1936)
 2005 - 2009 : Bruno Welti
 2010 - 2014 : Jean-Michel Mascherpa (1942)
 2015 - 2018 : Maurice Zahnd
 2019 - 2022 : Dominique Juilland (1953)

Notes

References

External links
 Official website

Suisse Alpina
Freemasonry in Switzerland
1844 establishments in Switzerland